Tropidofusus benthocallis is a species of large sea snail, marine gastropod mollusk in the family Columbariidae.

Description

Distribution
This marine species occurs off the South Orkneys.

References

External links
 Harasewych M.G. (2018). Tropidofusus ypotethys: a new genus and new species of Columbariidae (Mollusca: Gastropoda: Turbinelloidea). Molluscan Research. DOI: 10.1080/13235818.2018.1484265: 1–11

Turbinellidae
Gastropods described in 1907